Ang Lihim ni Annasandra is a 2014 Philippine television drama fantasy series broadcast by GMA Network. It premiered on the network's Afternoon Prime line up from October 6, 2014 to February 6, 2015.

Mega Manila ratings are provided by AGB Nielsen Philippines.

Series overview

Episodes

October 2014

November 2014

December 2014

January 2015

February 2015

Notes

a. The series was preempted on January 16 and 17 to give way for the Pastoral Visit of Pope Francis to the Philippines.

References

Lists of Philippine drama television series episodes